A Linn Yaung (lit. Light, also spelled ALINNYAUNG and A Lin Yaung; born Wai Yan Myint on 22 April 1992) is a Burmese actor, model and singer. He was nominated for the Best Actor award at the 2018 Myanmar Academy Award for his performance in the film The Bride.

Early life and education 
A Linn Yaung was born on April 22, 1992 in Mandalay, Myanmar, to parent Maung Maung Myint and his wife Thi Thi Swe. Yaung is the middle child among three siblings, having an older and younger brother. He went to monastic school and earned a B.A  in English from Yadanabon University in 2011. Yaung also holds a diploma in English from the University of Foreign Languages, Mandalay.

Career

2008–2011: Beginnings as a model
In late 2008, Yaung began working as a model for Talent & Model Agency Mandalay, taking part in fashion show catwalks as well as taking up acting roles in various TV commercial and advertisements. During this time, he had been recognized as a brand ambassador of Unique Men wears and later, Bison Energy drink. His dedicated work as a model and his acting roles in commercials was noticed by the film industry, subsequently resulting in an increase in film casting offers.

2012–2015: Acting debut and challenge
In 2012, Young signed a seven year contract with Mahogany Film Production as their lead actor. He made his acting debut in 2013 with the film Swel Ser Pyit Lite Tot, starring alongside Yan Aung, Thu Riya, and Soe Myat Thuzar. Yaung then starred in his second film A Thel Kyi Wittye alongside Wutt Hmone Shwe Yi and Thu Riya. In 2014, he took on his first big-screen lead role in the drama First Love with Thinzar Nwe Win which screened in Myanmar cinemas on 18 December 2015. He then played the lead role in the 2017 film Bal Yee Ser Ko Achit Sone Lae. Following a series of disagreements, Yaung left Mahogany Film Production in late 2015 and released his first solo album in 2016.

2016–present: Rising popularity and breakthrough 

Yaung signed an acting deal with Dawei Film Production in 2016 and collaborated with Burmese director Wyne; Yaung is currently continuing his work with Dawei Production. His debut solo album "Oh! My Crush" was released on 21 May 2016. In 2017, he starred in the drama film Shwe Kyar (Golden Lotus), in which he co-starred with Phway Phway and Thinzar Wint Kyaw; Shwe Kyar began screening in Myanmar cinemas on March 16, 2018. That same year, he starred as the male lead in the 2018 horror drama film Carbon Dioxide, alongside Kyaw Htet Aung, Phway Phway and Yadanar Bo. His portrayal of the villain character was received well by Yaung's fans, with praise going towards his acting performance and interpretation of his character. Subsequently, Yaung experienced a new surge in popularity.

A Linn Yaung co-starred with Phway Phway in the horror film Tadotamee (The Bride), which earned him a nomination for the 2018 Myanmar Academy Award for Best Actor. The same year, he was nominated for Best Supporting Actor for his role inShwe Kyar (Golden Lotus) at the 2018 ASEAN International Film Festival & Awards (AIFFA).

Political activities
Following the 2021 Myanmar coup d'état, A Linn Yaung was active in the anti-coup movement at physical rallies and through social media. He has taken part in protests since February. Yaung joined the "We Want Justice" three-finger salute movement.

On April 4, 2021, warrants for his arrest were issued under section 505 (a) of the penal code by the State Administration Council for speaking out against the military coup. Along with several other celebrities, he was charged with calling for participation in the Civil Disobedience Movement (CDM) and damaging the state's ability to govern, with supporting the Committee Representing Pyidaungsu Hluttaw, and with the generally incitement of the people with he intention of disturbing the peace and stability of Myanmar.

Filmography

Film (Cinema)

Film

Television series

Discography

Solo albums
 Oh! My Crush (2016)

Awards and nominations

References

External links
 

Living people
1992 births
Burmese male film actors
21st-century Burmese male actors
People from Mandalay Region
Burmese male models